World Rock Day, in Portuguese Dia Mundial do Rock, is observed annually on July 13 and celebrates rock music. The date alludes to the Live Aid benefit concert, organized by Bob Geldof and Midge Ure on July 13, 1985, to raise funds for relief of the 1983–1985 famine in Ethiopia; however, even though the holiday is called "World Rock Day", it is celebrated only in Brazil.

July 13 was also chosen in reference to a statement made by Phil Collins at Live Aid, in which he expressed his desire that the date would become a "World Rock Day".

References

July observances
Public holidays in Brazil
Observances in Brazil
Rock music